Planning law or Town and Country Planning is the system by which the British government seeks to maintain a balance between economic development and environmental quality in England. The primary legislation for this field of law is provided by the Town and Country Planning Act 1947 and the Town and Country Planning Act 1990.

In support of the primary legislation, a secondary branch of legislation called Statutory Instruments either amends or adds to the existing framework of regulation.

Provided below is an incomplete list of Statutory Instruments relating to Town & Country Planning:

Statutory Instruments of 1995

 Town and Country Planning (Use Classes) (Amendment) Order 1995 S.I. 1995/297
 Town and Country Planning General Development (Amendment) Order 1995 S.I. 1995/298
 Town and Country Planning (Environmental Assessment and Permitted Development) Regulations 1995 S.I. 1995/417
 Town and Country Planning (General Permitted Development) Order 1995 S.I. 1995/418
 Town and Country Planning (General Development Procedure) Order 1995 S.I. 1995/419
 Town and Country Planning (Crown Land Applications) Regulations 1995 S.I. 1995/1139
 Town and Country Planning (Simplified Planning Zones) (Scotland) Regulations 1995 S.I. 1995/2043
 Town and Country Planning (Simplified Planning Zones) (Scotland) Order 1995 S.I. 1995/2044
 Town and Country Planning (Environmental Assessment and Unauthorised Development) Regulations 1995 S.I. 1995/2258
 Town and Country Planning (Determination of Appeals by Appointed Persons) (Prescribed Classes) (Amendment) Regulations 1995 S.I. 1995/2259
 Town and Country Planning (Minerals) Regulations 1995 S.I. 1995/2863
 Town and Country Planning (Limit of Annual Value) (Scotland) Order 1995 S.I. 1995/3048
 Town and Country Planning (General Development Procedure) (Welsh Forms) Order 1995 S.I. 1995/3336

Statutory Instruments of 1996

 Town and Country Planning (Costs of Inquiries etc.) (Standard Daily Amount) Regulations 1996 S.I. 1996/24
 Town and Country Planning (General Development Procedure) (Scotland) Amendment Order 1996 S.I. 1996/467
 Town and Country Planning (Costs of Inquiries etc.) (Standard Daily Amount) (Scotland) Regulations 1996 S.I. 1996/493
 Town and Country Planning (General Permitted Development) (Amendment) Order 1996 S.I. 1996/528
 Town and Country Planning (General Permitted Development) (Scotland) Amendment Order 1996 S.I. 1996/1266
 Town and Country Planning (General Development Procedure) (Amendment) Order 1996 S.I. 1996/1817
 Town and Country Planning (Costs of Inquiries etc.) (Examination in Public) Regulations 1996 S.I. 1996/2382
 Town and Country Planning (General Permitted Development) (Scotland) Amendment (No. 2) Order 1996 S.I. 1996/3023
 Town and Country Planning (Atomic Energy Establishments Special Development) (Revocation) Order 1996 S.I. 1996/3194

United Kingdom planning law